Večernje novosti (Evening News) is a Serbian daily tabloid newspaper. Founded in 1953, it quickly grew into a high-circulation daily. Novosti (as most people call it for short) also employs foreign correspondents spread around 23 national capitals around the globe.

The principal Yugoslav-level media companies were Borba and Tanjug. Borba published two daily newspapers, Borba and Večernje novosti. Borba was a daily broad-sheet, was well known as the official voice of the government, and in the early 1950s, it was the best-selling newspaper in Yugoslavia. The second daily newspaper published by Borba was Večernje novosti, a well-edited evening paper. It was a modern tabloid with short news, human interest stories, big photos, well-written headlines, and many sports, city and regional reports. For a long period of time Veĉernje novosti had the largest circulation in Yugoslavia. Only Večernji list from Zagreb occasionally beat them.

History
It first appeared on stands on 16 October 1953, edited by Slobodan Glumac, who set the newspaper's tone for years to come. Housing an extensive network of journalists and contributors, the paper reported and commented on various issues and events according to its mantra: fast, brief and clear.

In mid-1980s Novosti got a big scoop by publishing the old files of the State Commission for War Crimes, which shed new light on Austrian president Kurt Waldheim's involvement in war crimes during World War II. The file F-25572 dated 17 November 1947, which Novosti published for the first time gave new details of Waldheim's whereabouts in Yugoslavia during the war.

Yugoslav Wars era

In September 1986, parts of the SANU Memorandum were published by Večernje novosti.

Although it is one of the region's longest enduring newspapers, it is also remembered for its association with the regime of Slobodan Milošević. During the years leading up to the dictator's overthrow, Novosti was one of his main mouthpieces. Loyalty to his regime was the most important job requirement at the paper in this period. Through party-installed apparatchiks like Dušan Cukić (then editor-in-chief), Milošević was able to control the paper and use it to espouse propaganda.

Post-Yugoslav Wars era
On the cover of its 21 September 2000 edition, Večernje novosti tried to use a doctored photo of Milošević's pre-election town meeting in Berane, Republic of Montenegro, to increase the number of people present with photo-montage. Two pictures of the event from the same angle were taken and then side by side pasted and as such published. But nevertheless, video from the same event showed people were actually present on other side (it was not empty) and if it were an actual panoramic picture published (technique not implemented by photographer in time) showing from left to right, it would not change the perception of the number of people present as it would show a full stadium.

Privatization
On 4 February 2006, retired basketball ace Vlade Divac expressed his desire to invest in Novosti, perhaps even buy the majority stake, but decided to lie low until the paper's complex ownership structure disputes were resolved. There was also an initial interest from two media conglomerates, WAZ-Mediengruppe and Northcliffe Media, a division of Daily Mail and General Trust in buying a stake in Večernje novosti.

Editorial history

 Slobodan Glumac (1953–1957)
 Vasilije Kraljević (1957–1959)
 Bogdan Pešić (1959–1963)
 Slobodan Glumac (1963–1969)
 Mirko Stamenković (1969–1972)
 Jovan Jauković (1972–1974)
 Živko Milić (1974–1976)
 Tomislav Milinović (1976–1984)
 Ilija Borovnjak (1984–1987)
 Radoslav Brajović (1987–1998)
 Pero Simić (1998–2000)
 Dušan Čukić (2000)
 Manojlo Vukotić (2000–2013)
 Ratko Dmitrović (2013–2017)
 Milorad Vučelić (2017–present)

See also
 List of newspapers in Serbia

References

External links
Official website

Newspapers published in Serbia
Newspapers published in Yugoslavia
Newspapers established in 1953
1953 establishments in Serbia